The Cabin Creek Ranger Residence and Dormitory, also known as the Cabin Creek Ranger Station, were built in 1934 and 1935 in Sequoia National Park by the Civilian Conservation Corps. The three-room wood-frame residence and the two-room dormitory are examples of the National Park Service Rustic style.

The two buildings stand close to the former site of the Lost Grove Entrance Station.  They were built by CCC workers from the Buckeye CCC camp during the summers of 1934 and 1935, to house rangers for the Lost Grove entrance to the Generals Highway. Originally intended to be located at Lost Grove and to use sequoia logs, the move to nearby Cabin Creek resulted in a change to a wood appropriate to the new location, which did not feature sequoias. Design work for the buildings was carried out by Park Service  landscape architect Harold G, Fowler and Emergency Conservation Work landscape architect Lloyd Fletcher.

References

Residential buildings on the National Register of Historic Places in California
Government buildings completed in 1934
Residential buildings completed in 1934
National Register of Historic Places in Sequoia National Park
Rustic architecture in California
Civilian Conservation Corps in California
University and college dormitories in the United States
National Park Service ranger stations
1934 establishments in California